550 Music (originally known as Sony 550 Music) was a unit of Sony Music Entertainment, which operated through Sony Music's Epic Records division while in activity. Launched in 1992, the "550" name was inspired by the address of the Sony building, located at 550 Madison Avenue in New York.  The label was folded in 2000 by Epic Records, it was part of the restructuring when Tommy Mottola was leaving Sony Music.

Artists on label
 3 Lb. Thrill
 Amel Larrieux
 Apollo 440
 Ben Folds Five
 Bolt Upright
Carl Hancock Rux
 Celine Dion
 Coco Lee
 Damascus Road Experience
 Deep Forest
 Des'ree
 Echolyn
 Eve's Plum
 Fear of Pop
 Flight 16
 Flop
 For Squirrels
 Fuel
 George Clinton & the P.Funk All-Stars
 Ginuwine
 Haley Bennett
 Infectious Grooves
 Jon B.
 Mandy Moore
 Men of Vizion
 Mista Grimm
 moe.
 Motherland
 Nine Days
 No-Man
 Old Pike
 Patra
 Rah-Sun
 Social Distortion
 Taja Sevelle
 Tanto Metro & Devonte
 The Poor
 Ultimate Fakebook
 Vallejo
 Velvet Crush
 Verbow
 Vernon Reid
 Vonda Shepard
 XC-NN

See also
 List of record labels

References

 
Record labels established in 1992
Record labels disestablished in 2000
Defunct record labels of the United States